Abdullahi Garba Aminchi (born 11 March 1954) in Funtua LGA, Katsina State, Nigeria, was the deputy governor of the short lived NRC government led by Alhaji Saidu Barda from 1992 to 1993. He was the deputy to the then Governor Umaru Musa Yar'Adua in 2003. He also held the position of Ambassador to Saudi Arabia and Oman during the Umaru Musa Yar’adua presidential regime from 2007.

Early life and education 
Abdullahi Garba was born on 11 March 1954 in Funtua LGA, Katsina. He studied engineering at Kaduna Polytechnic. He later received a diploma in legal studies from the Bayero University Kano.

Career 
Abdullahi Garba left the engineering field to join politics. He started as a party secretary, then councilor to chairman and later deputy governor to Saidu Barda in 1992 and in 2003 to Umaru Musa Yar'Adua. After governor Umaru Musa Yar'Adua contested for the presidency and won in 2007, Garba was made Nigeria's ambassador to Saudi Arabia and Oman.

References 

People from Katsina
1954 births
Living people